Xenophidion acanthognathus, also known as the Bornean spine-jawed snake is a species of snake in the monotypic family Xenophidiidae.

It is found in Sabah and Sarawak on the island of Borneo, Malaysia.

References 

Alethinophidia
Snakes of Southeast Asia
Endemic fauna of Borneo
Endemic fauna of Malaysia
Reptiles of Malaysia
Reptiles described in 1995
Reptiles of Borneo